Thore "Tore" Ingvar Sjöstrand (31 July 1921 – 26 January 2011) was a Swedish steeplechase runner. He won a bronze medal at the 1946 European Championships and a gold at the 1948 Summer Olympics.

Domestically Sjöstrand won two titles, in 1947 and 1948, and finished second five times. After finishing eighth at the 1950 European championships he retired and moved to Växjö. There he worked as a retailer and died aged 89.

References

1921 births
2011 deaths
Swedish male long-distance runners
Olympic athletes of Sweden
Athletes (track and field) at the 1948 Summer Olympics
Olympic gold medalists for Sweden
Swedish male steeplechase runners
European Athletics Championships medalists
Medalists at the 1948 Summer Olympics
Olympic gold medalists in athletics (track and field)
People from Huddinge Municipality
Sportspeople from Stockholm County